Fumiko Yonezawa (米沢 富美子; 1938 – 17 January 2019) was a Japanese theoretical physicist. She researched semi-conductors and liquid metals.

Yonezawa obtained BSc, MSc and Ph. D from Kyoto University, and spent a year researching at Keele University in the United Kingdom during her doctoral studies. She worked with a group of scientists at Keio University, simulating amorphous structures using computers and then creating visualizations of them.

She was made President of the Physics Society of Japan in 1996, the first woman to hold the position. in 1984 she was awarded the Saruhashi Prize, and in 2005 a L'Oréal-UNESCO Award for Women in Science for "pioneering theory and computer simulations on amorphous semiconductors and liquid metals." She died on 17 January 2019, aged 80.

Selected publications

References

Further reading

External links
, L’Oréal Foundation

1938 births
2019 deaths
Theoretical physicists
Japanese women physicists
Kyoto University alumni
L'Oréal-UNESCO Awards for Women in Science laureates
20th-century Japanese physicists
21st-century Japanese physicists
20th-century Japanese women scientists
21st-century Japanese  women scientists
Presidents of the Physical Society of Japan